Brahian Milton Alemán Athaydes (born 23 December 1989) is an Uruguayan footballer who plays as an attacking midfielder for Gimnasia La Plata.

After a spectacular 2014 season with Arsenal de Sarandí, scoring nine goals and grabbing two assists, Alemán was linked to a number of clubs. Boca Juniors, Independiente, and Barcelona Sporting Club were some of the large number of clubs interested in acquiring Aleman, with the latter ultimately landing Alemán's services for a fee of $3 million. He signed a 3-year contract.

References

External links
 
 Brahian Alemán at playmakerstats.com (English version of ceroacero.es)
 

1989 births
Living people
Uruguayan footballers
Uruguayan expatriate footballers
Footballers from Montevideo
Association football midfielders
Olympic footballers of Uruguay
Danubio F.C. players
Defensor Sporting players
Unión de Santa Fe footballers
Arsenal de Sarandí footballers
Barcelona S.C. footballers
L.D.U. Quito footballers
Club de Gimnasia y Esgrima La Plata footballers
Ettifaq FC players
Uruguayan Primera División players
Argentine Primera División players
Primera Nacional players
Ecuadorian Serie A players
Saudi Professional League players
Uruguayan expatriate sportspeople in Argentina
Uruguayan expatriate sportspeople in Ecuador
Uruguayan expatriate sportspeople in Saudi Arabia
Expatriate footballers in Argentina
Expatriate footballers in Ecuador
Expatriate footballers in Saudi Arabia